Site of the First CPC National Congress · South Huangpi Road is an interchange station on lines 1 and 14 of the Shanghai Metro; line 1 opened on 10 April 1995 as part of the section between  and ; It became an interchange station on 31 December 2021 with the opening of line 14.

On 20 June 2021, to celebrate the 100th Anniversary of the Chinese Communist Party, the station name changed from South Huangpi Road Station to Site of the First CPC National Congress · South Huangpi Road Station.

The station is situated within the Inner Ring Road and adjacent to Middle Huaihai Road, the major up-market shopping street in Shanghai.

The neighbourhood in the vicinity was a residential district in the old French Concession. In recent years, the area was bought by a property developer and turned into an expensive restaurant district. Large-scale demolition has reduced the number of residents in the area, and replaced them with restaurants and large, Hong Kong-style shopping malls.

Station Layout

Places nearby
 Huaihai Road (M.), shopping street
 Xintiandi, shopping and nightlife area
 Museum of the First National Congress of the Chinese Communist Party

Gallery

References

Shanghai Metro stations in Huangpu District
Line 1, Shanghai Metro
Railway stations in China opened in 1995
Railway stations in Shanghai
Line 14, Shanghai Metro